Heinz Schiller (Frauenfeld, Switzerland, January 25, 1930 – Montana, Switzerland, March 26, 2007), was a racing driver from Switzerland.  He participated in one Formula One World Championship Grand Prix, on August 5, 1962.  He retired from the race, scoring no championship points.

Schiller was a speedboat champion in his native Switzerland before turning to sports car racing, finding success during the mid-1950s. He then switched to single seater cars, starting in hillclimbing before moving up to circuit racing.

He first appeared in Formula One at the beginning of 1962 with Ecurie Nationale Suisse, driving their three-year-old Porsche in the Brussels Grand Prix, where he finished 8th on aggregate after the three heats. He subsequently drove the same car at the 1962 Pau Grand Prix, coming home 9th.

Under the Ecurie Filipinetti banner but still driving the same Porsche, Schiller failed to qualify at the Naples Grand Prix, largely because only 10 cars were permitted to take the start. He was entered by Ecurie Maarsbergen for the 1962 Belgian Grand Prix but was withdrawn, before finishing 7th in the Grosser Preis der Solitude for Ecurie Filipinetti. He then switched to a Lotus 24 for his single World Championship event, the 1962 German Grand Prix which ended with oil pressure problems, as did his attempt at the Mediterranean Grand Prix, now back in the Porsche.

Schiller made one appearance in Formula One in 1963, finishing 3rd at Pau but five laps down, again in the old Porsche, before returning to sports cars. He finished 10th at the 1964 24 Hours of Le Mans with Gerhard Koch.

Complete Formula One World Championship results
(key)

Non-Championship
(key) (Races in italics indicate fastest lap)

References
 "The Grand Prix Who's Who", Steve Small, 1995.
 "The Formula One Record Book", John Thompson, 1974.

1930 births
2007 deaths
Swiss racing drivers
Swiss Formula One drivers
Scuderia Filipinetti Formula One drivers
24 Hours of Le Mans drivers
World Sportscar Championship drivers
12 Hours of Reims drivers
Porsche Motorsports drivers